Arnett is a town in and the county seat of Ellis County, Oklahoma, United States. The population was 524 at the 2010 census, an 0.77 percent increase from 520 at the 2000 census.

History
The townsite came about at the junction of local trading routes. A post office was established at the townsite in 1902, with William G. Brown as the postmaster. Brown is said to have named the post office Arnett after A. S. Arnett, Brown's minister from Fayetteville, West Virginia.

After statehood in 1907, several county boundaries changed, and the southern part of old Day County was added to the southwestern part of Woodward County to become Ellis County. An election to locate the county seat was held in June of 1908, and resulted in a runoff between Arnett and Shattuck, Oklahoma.  Arnett won and remains the county seat today.

Geography
Arnett is located at  (36.134368, −99.770826) at an elevation of 2,447 feet (746 m).

Climate
Arnett has a humid subtropical climate (Köppen Cfa) with hot, humid summers and cold, dry winters. The average temperature in Arnett is 57 °F (13 °C), and the average yearly precipitation is 25.4 inches (644 mm). On average, January is the coolest month, July is the warmest month, and May is the wettest month. The hottest temperature recorded in Arnett was 110 °F (43 °C) in 1951; the coldest temperature recorded was -12 °F (-24 °C) in 1959.

Demographics

As of the census of 2010, there were 524 people living in the town. The population density was 1,300 people per square mile (478/km2). The racial makeup of the town was 96.35% White, 0.38% African American, 0.96% Native American, 1.15% from other races, and 1.15% from two or more races. Hispanic or Latino of any race were 1.35% of the population.

There were 238 households, out of which 23.1% had children under the age of 18 living with them, 51.3% were married couples living together, 5.9% had a female householder with no husband present, and 40.8% were non-families. 39.1% of all households were made up of individuals, and 19.3% had someone living alone who was 65 years of age or older. The average household size was 2.13 and the average family size was 2.81.

In the town, the population was spread out, with 21.3% under the age of 18, 6.3% from 18 to 24, 23.3% from 25 to 44, 25.8% from 45 to 64, and 23.3% who were 65 years of age or older. The median age was 44 years. For every 100 females, there were 97.0 males. For every 100 females age 18 and over, there were 94.8 males.

The median income for a household in the town was $26,618, and the median income for a family was $29,861. Males had a median income of $24,250 versus $13,438 for females. The per capita income for the town was $14,512. About 12.8% of families and 18.9% of the population were below the poverty line, including 27.4% of those under age 18 and 20.0% of those age 65 or over.

Education
Arnett Public Schools operates one school in the town, Arnett School (Grades Pre-K-12).

Transportation
U.S. Route 60 and SH-51 run concurrently east–west through Arnett. U.S. Route 283, a north–south highway which meets U.S. 60 and SH-51 roughly one-half mile east of town, runs concurrently east–west with U.S. 60 and SH-51 through town. Arnett is also the southern terminus of SH-46 which runs north–south.

Media
Arnett has a weekly newspaper, The Ellis County Capital.

Historical Sites
The Ellis County Courthouse, built in 1912, is in the center of the Courthouse Square in Arnett.  The Courthouse is on the National Register of Historic Places listings in Ellis County, Oklahoma.

A log cabin sits just south of the Ellis County Courthouse on the Courthouse lawn, variously known as the Historic Log Cabin of Arnett or the Ellis County Log Cabin.  It was built in 1893 of huge cedar logs, some as much as 2-1/2 feet across.  It was used as a residence until 1939, and soon thereafter disassembled and put back together in Arnett for preservation.  

The remains of Grand, Oklahoma, included on the National Register of Historic Places listings in Ellis County, Oklahoma as Grand Town Site, is 14 miles south of Arnett.  This town was voted the seat of old Day County in 1893; however, Day County was eliminated at Oklahoma statehood.  The post office closed September 30, 1943, and only building footings remain today.

Recreation
Fort Supply Reservoir and Cooper Wildlife Management Area are to the northwest.

Lake Lloyd Vincent and the Ellis County Wildlife Management Area are to the southwest. 

Paddlesack Wildlife Management Area is to the south, while the Black Kettle National Grassland is further south.

Notable people
Notable individuals who were born in and/or have lived in Arnett include:

Olin Branstetter, Oklahoma state legislator
Donald J. Gott (1923-1944), U.S. Army 1st Lieutenant, Medal of Honor recipient

References

External links
 Encyclopedia of Oklahoma History and Culture - Arnett

Towns in Ellis County, Oklahoma
Towns in Oklahoma
County seats in Oklahoma